Piech or Pieech is a Central European surname. This Slavic name originates from Poland, and spread to Czechoslovakia and Germany. It is known for being held by members of the Austrian business family Porsche-Piëch clan.

Persons
Notable people with the surname include:

Anton Piëch (1894–1952), Austrian lawyer, co-founder of Porsche GmbH, and manager of Volkswagen GmbH
Ferdinand Piëch (1937–2019), Austrian business magnate, son of Anton Piëch and Louise Piëch
Louise Piëch (1904–1999), Austrian businessperson, wife of Anton Piëch, daughter of Ferdinand Porsche
Arkadiusz Piech (born 1985), Polish footballer
Krzysztof Piech (born 1975), Polish economist

Families and lineages
Notable familial groupings with this surname include:

 Piëch family, the Austrian-German Porsche-Pieech automotive and business clan behind Volkswagen and Porsche

See also

References

Polish-language surnames
Surnames from given names